MEPSO Electricity Transmission System Operator of North Macedonia is a state-owned transmission system operator company for electricity with headquarters in Skopje, North Macedonia. It was founded in 2005, after being split from Elektrostopanstvo na Makedonija (ESM) and it is specialized in the transmission of electrical power. It is a member of the European Network of Transmission System Operators for Electricity.

History 

In 2005, the former state monopoly ESM ( [], litt. Electricity of Macedonia) was split in three companies:
 A state-owned transmission system operator MEPSO
 A state-owned power-producing company, initially called ELEM ( [], litt. Power plants of Macedonia), in charge of the country's power plants. The company was renamed in 2019 as ESM (Elektrani na Severna Makedonija, litt. Power plants of North Macedonia) after the country itself changed its name to North Macedonia, reverting to the initialism used between 1990 and 2006.
 A distribution and supply company, initially called ESM AD, sold in 2006 to Austrian EVN Group and renamed as EVN Macedonia, rebranded in 2019 as EVN AD Skopje.

Organization and management of MEPSO 
The Transmission System Operator of Macedonia (MEPSO) is a joint stock company in full state ownership, whose founder is the Government of the Republic of Macedonia. The company was established by a decision of the Government of the Republic of Macedonia, based on the Law on Transformation of the Electricity Company of Macedonia from 2004. MEPSO manages the transmission network at 400 kV and 110 kV voltage level, with a total length of 2,021 km. MEPSO is a member of the European Association of System Operators ENTSO-E. In different periods, the position of General Director was performed by: Nenad Jovanovski, Sinisa Spasov, etc.

Occupation 
The main activity of MEPSO is to provide uninterrupted transmission of electricity through the transmission network and management of the power system, in order to ensure reliable supply of consumers with quality electricity. MEPSO has two licenses, issued by the National Energy Regulatory Commission, the first of which is the Transmission System Operator, and the second is the Electricity Market Operator (OPEE).

Financial statements and indicators 
As of December 31, 2015, the total assets of MEPSO amounted to 10,153,350,000 denars, most of which were real estate, plant and equipment (7,845,072,000 denars) and current assets (2,290,181,000 denars). On the other hand, the company MEPSO had total liabilities in the amount of 5,269,984,000 denars, while the total capital and reserves amounted to 4,883,366,000 denars (of which the share capital amounted to 3,059,393,000 denars). Regarding the income statement, in 2015, the company MEPSO generated revenues from the sale of electricity in the amount of 5,121,133,000 denars, operating profit amounted to 816,906,000 denars, and profit after tax 705,181,000 denars. In 2014, the profit after tax was 501,452,000 denars.

References

External links

Electric power companies of North Macedonia
Energy companies established in 2005
Macedonian companies established in 2005
Companies based in Skopje
Government-owned companies of North Macedonia
Government-owned energy companies
Electric power transmission system operators